Polica may refer to: 


Places

Poland
Polica (mountain), a mountain in the Żywiec Beskids mountain range

Slovenia
Polica, Grosuplje, a settlement in the Municipality of Grosuplje
Polica, Naklo, a settlement in the Municipality of Naklo
Babna Polica, a settlement in the  Municipality of Loška Dolina
Bloška Polica, a settlement in the Municipality of Cerknica
Huda Polica, a settlement in the Municipality of Grosuplje
Praprotna Polica, a settlement in the Municipality of Cerklje na Gorenjskem
Pšenična Polica, a settlement in the Municipality of Cerklje na Gorenjskem

Music
Poliça, an American indie pop and alternative rock band from Minneapolis, Minnesota